1P-LSD or 1-propionyl-lysergic acid diethylamide is a psychedelic drug of the lysergamide class that is a derivative and functional analogue of LSD and a homologue of ALD-52.  It has been sold online as a designer drug since 2015. It modifies the LSD molecule by adding a propionyl group to the nitrogen molecule of LSD's indole.

Pharmacology 
Since LSD is detected when 1P-LSD is incubated in human serum, 1P-LSD acts, at least in part, as a prodrug for LSD.

Effects 

The effects profile of 1P-LSD is not well defined in the scientific literature. It is generally thought to be comparable to that of LSD. A study in 2020 found that intravenous administration of 1P-LSD has a somewhat shorter duration than LSD in humans. 1P-LSD is present for a very short time (4 hours) prior to being completed metabolized to LSD. The 2020 study found that it is not possible to reliably distinguish between the oral uptake of LSD and 1P-LSD until unique metabolites are detected by sensitive analytical methods. Qualitative effects were similar when comparing intravenous and oral delivery between the two drugs. The slow onset after intravenous application for 1P-LSD appears to be due to the slowed passage of LSD into the central nervous system compared to other serotonergic hallucinogens. Some users in the study reported an absence of "bad drug effects", but this is likely due to the setting than as a characteristic of 1P-LSD.

Legal status 
As of 2015, 1P-LSD is regulated under the United States Federal Analogue Act and is classified as a schedule 1 drug.  
1P-LSD is a controlled substance in France, Finland, Denmark, Germany, Estonia, Japan, Latvia, Norway, Romania, Sweden, Switzerland, United Kingdom, Italy, Singapore the Czech Republic (banned in 2018) and Croatia. 1P-LSD has been illegal in Russia since 2017 as an LSD derivative.

See also 
 1cP-LSD
 1B-LSD
 1V-LSD
 ALD-52
 1cP-AL-LAD
 AL-LAD
 ETH-LAD
 1P-ETH-LAD
 PRO-LAD
 LSM-775
 LSZ
 O-Acetylpsilocin (4-AcO-DMT)

References 

Designer drugs
Lysergamides
Prodrugs
Serotonin receptor agonists